Sahatsakhan is a district (amphoe) in the central part of Kalasin province, northeastern Thailand.

Geography
Neighboring districts are (from the east clockwise): Somdet, Mueang Kalasin, Nong Kung Si, Sam Chai, and Kham Muang of Kalasin Province.

Administration
The district is divided into eight sub-districts (tambons), which are further subdivided into 85 villages (mubans). Non Buri is a township (thesaban tambon) which covers parts of tambon Non Buri. There are a further seven tambon administrative organizations (TAO).

Sahatsakhan